Syncerus is a genus of African bovid that contains the living Cape buffalo (Syncerus caffer), including the distinct African forest buffalo.

At least one extinct species belongs to this genus; Syncerus acoelotus. The extinct giant African buffalo (Syncerus antiquus) is also included in this genus by many authorities.

References

Mammal genera
Mammal genera with one living species
Taxa named by Brian Houghton Hodgson
Bovines